Nivolumab, sold under the brand name Opdivo, is a medication used to treat a number of types of cancer. This includes melanoma, lung cancer, malignant pleural mesothelioma, renal cell carcinoma, Hodgkin lymphoma, head and neck cancer, urothelial carcinoma, colon cancer, esophageal squamous cell carcinoma, liver cancer, gastric cancer, and esophageal or gastroesophageal junction (GEJ) cancer. It is used by slow injection into a vein.

The most common side effects include fatigue, rash, musculoskeletal pain, pruritus, diarrhea, nausea, asthenia, cough, dyspnea, constipation, decreased appetite, back pain, arthralgia, upper respiratory tract infection, pyrexia, headache, abdominal pain, and vomiting. Use during pregnancy may harm the baby and use when breastfeeding is not recommended. Nivolumab is a human IgG4 monoclonal antibody that blocks PD-1. It is a type of immunotherapy and works as a checkpoint inhibitor, blocking a signal that prevents activation of T cells from attacking the cancer. The most common side effects when used in combination with chemotherapy include peripheral neuropathy (damage to the nerves outside of the brain and spinal cord), nausea, fatigue, diarrhea, vomiting, decreased appetite, abdominal pain, constipation and musculoskeletal pain.

Nivolumab was approved for medical use in the United States in 2014. It is on the World Health Organization's List of Essential Medicines. It is made using Chinese hamster ovary cells. Nivolumab is the second FDA-approved systemic therapy for mesothelioma and is the first FDA-approved immunotherapy for the first-line treatment of gastric cancer.

Medical uses
In the U.S., nivolumab is indicated to treat:

Nivolumab is used as a first-line treatment for inoperable or metastatic melanoma in combination with ipilimumab if the cancer does not have a mutation in BRAF,  and as a second-line treatment for inoperable or metastatic melanoma following treatment of ipilimumab and, if the cancer has a BRAF mutation, a BRAF inhibitor. It is also used to treat metastatic squamous non-small cell lung cancer with progression with or after platinum-based drugs and for treatment of small cell lung cancer It also used as a second-line treatment for renal cell carcinoma after anti-angiogenic treatment has failed.

Nivolumab is used for primary or metastatic urothelial carcinoma, the most common form of bladder cancer. It can be prescribed for locally advanced or metastatic form of the condition that experience disease progression during or following platinum-containing chemotherapy or have progression within 12 months of neoadjuvant or adjuvant treatment with platinum-containing chemotherapy.

Nivolumab is indicated for the adjuvant treatment of people with melanoma with involvement of lymph nodes or in people with metastatic disease who have undergone complete resection.

The combination of nivolumab with ipilimumab is used for the first-line treatment of adults with malignant pleural mesothelioma (MPM) that cannot be removed by surgery.

In April 2021, the U.S. Food and Drug Administration (FDA) approved nivolumab, in combination with certain types of chemotherapy, for the initial treatment of people with advanced or metastatic gastric cancer, gastroesophageal junction cancer and esophageal adenocarcinoma.

In May 2021, the U.S. FDA approved nivolumab for people with completely resected esophageal or gastroesophageal junction (GEJ) cancer with residual pathologic disease who have received neoadjuvant chemoradiotherapy.

In August 2021, the U.S. FDA approved nivolumab for the adjuvant treatment of people with urothelial carcinoma (UC) who are at high risk of recurrence after undergoing radical resection.

In May 2022, the  U.S. FDA expanded the indication to include the first-line treatment of patients with advanced or metastatic esophageal squamous cell carcinoma (ESCC).

Side effects
The drug label contains warnings with regard to increased risks of severe immune-mediated inflammation of the lungs, the colon, the liver, the kidneys (with accompanying kidney dysfunction), as well as immune-mediated hypothyroidism and hyperthyroidism. Hypothyroidism may affect 8.5% and hyperthyroidism 3.7%. Autoimmune diabetes similar to diabetes mellitus type 1 may occur in approximately 2% of people treated with nivolumab.

In trials for melanoma, the following side effects occurred in more than 10% of subjects and more frequently than with chemotherapy alone: rash and itchy skin, cough, upper respiratory tract infections, and peripheral edema. Other clinically important side effects with less than 10% frequency were ventricular arrhythmia, inflammation of parts of the eye (iridocyclitis), infusion-related reactions, dizziness, peripheral and sensory neuropathy, peeling skin, erythema multiforme, vitiligo, and psoriasis.

In trials for lung cancer, the following side effects occurred in more than 10% of subjects and more frequently than with chemotherapy alone: fatigue, weakness, edema, fever, chest pain, generalized pain, shortness of breath, cough, muscle and joint pain, decreased appetite, abdominal pain, nausea and vomiting, constipation, weight loss, rash, and itchy skin.

Levels of electrolytes and blood cells counts were also disrupted.

Pregnancy and breastfeeding
Use during pregnancy may harm the baby; it is not known if nivolumab is secreted in breast milk but use during breastfeeding is not recommended.

Pharmacokinetics
Based on data from 909 patients, the terminal half-life of nivolumab is 26.7 days and steady-state concentrations were reached by 12 weeks when administered at 3 mg/kg every 2 weeks. Age, gender, race, baseline LDH, PD-L1 expression, tumor type, tumor size, renal impairment, and mild hepatic impairment do not affect clearance of the drug.

Mechanism of action
T cells protect the body from cancer by killing certain cancer cells. But cancer cells evolve proteins to protect themselves from T cells. Nivolumab blocks those protective proteins. Thus, the T cells can kill the cancer cells. This is an example of immune checkpoint blockade.

PD-1 is a protein on the surface of activated T cells. If another molecule, called programmed cell death 1 ligand 1 or programmed cell death 1 ligand 2 (PD-L1 or PD-L2), binds to PD-1, the T cell becomes inactive. This is one way that the body regulates the immune system, to avoid an overreaction. Many cancer cells make PD-L1, which inhibits T cells from attacking the tumor. Nivolumab blocks PD-L1 from binding to PD-1, allowing the T cell to work. PD-L1 is expressed on 40–50% of melanomas and has limited expression otherwise in most visceral organs with the exception of respiratory epithelium and placental tissue.

Physical properties
Nivolumab is a fully human monoclonal immunoglobulin G4  antibody to PD-1. The gamma 1 heavy chain is 91.8% unmodified human design while the kappa light chain is 98.9%.

History
Nivolumab was generated under intellectual property of Ono Pharmaceutical regarding PD-1 and under a research collaboration entered in 2005 between Ono and Medarex.

Through the research collaboration with Ono, it was invented by Dr. Changyu Wang and his team of scientists at Medarex using its transgenic mice with a humanized immune system; the discovery and in vitro characterization of the antibody, originally called MDX-1106/ONO-4538, was published (much later) in 2014. Under the agreement between the companies in 2005, Medarex held an exclusive right of nivolumab in North America, and Ono retained the right in all other countries except North America. 
Bristol-Myers Squibb acquired Medarex in 2009, for $2.4B, largely on the strength of its checkpoint inhibitor program.

Promising clinical trial results made public in 2012, caused excitement among industry analysts and in the mainstream media; PD-1 was being avidly pursued as a biological target at that time, with companies including Merck with pembrolizumab (Keytruda), Roche (via its subsidiary Genentech) with atezolizumab, GlaxoSmithKline in collaboration with the Maryland biotech company Amplimmune; and Teva in collaboration with the Israeli biotech company CureTech competing.

Ono received approval from Japanese regulatory authorities to use nivolumab to treat unresectable melanoma in July 2014, which was the first regulatory approval of a PD-1 inhibitor anywhere in the world.

Merck received its first FDA approval for its PD-1 inhibitor, pembrolizumab (Keytruda), in September 2014.

Nivolumab received FDA approval for the treatment of melanoma in December 2014.  In April 2015, the Committee for Medicinal Products for Human Use of the European Medicines Agency recommended approval of Nivolumab for metastatic melanoma as a monotherapy.

In March 2015, the U.S. FDA approved it for the treatment of squamous cell lung cancer.

On 19 June 2015, the European Medicines Agency (EMA) granted a marketing authorization valid throughout the European Union.

In November 2015, the FDA approved nivolumab as a second-line treatment for renal cell carcinoma after having granted the application breakthrough therapy designation, fast track designation, and priority review status.

In May 2016, the FDA approved nivolumab for the treatment of patients with classical Hodgkin lymphoma (cHL) who have relapsed or progressed after autologous hematopoietic stem cell transplantation (auto-HSCT) and post-transplantation brentuximab vedotin.

On 20 December 2017, the FDA granted approval to nivolumab for adjuvant treatment of melanoma with involvement of lymph nodes or for metastatic disease with complete resection.

On 16 April 2018, the FDA granted approval to nivolumab in combination with ipilimumab for the first-line treatment of intermediate and poor risk advanced renal cell carcinoma patients.

On 15 June 2018, China's Drug Administration approved nivolumab, the country's first immuno-oncology and the first PD-1 therapy.

In October 2020, the U.S. Food and Drug Administration (FDA) approved the combination of nivolumab with ipilimumab for the first-line treatment of adults with malignant pleural mesothelioma (MPM) that cannot be removed by surgery.

In April 2021, the FDA approved nivolumab, in combination with certain types of chemotherapy, for the initial treatment of people with advanced or metastatic gastric cancer, gastroesophageal junction cancer and esophageal adenocarcinoma.

Research

Nivolumab, and other PD-1 inhibitors, appear to be effective in people with brain metastases and for cancer in people with autoimmune diseases.

Hodgkin's lymphoma 
In Hodgkin's lymphoma, Reed–Sternberg cells harbor amplification of chromosome 9p24.1, which encodes PD-L1 and PD-L2 and leads to their constitutive expression. In a small clinical study published in 2015, nivolumab elicited an objective response rate of 87% in a cohort of 20 patients.

The evidence is very uncertain about the effect of Nivolumab for patients with a Hodgkin's lymphoma on the overall survival, the quality of life, the survival without a progression, the response rate (=complete disappear) and grade 3 or 4 serious adverse events.

Biomarkers
Amplification of chromosome 9p24 may serve as a predictive biomarker in Hodgkin's lymphoma.

Each company pursuing mAbs against PD-1 as drugs developed assays to measure PD-L1 levels as a potential biomarker using their drugs as the analyte-specific reagent in the assay. BMS partnered with Dako on a nivolumab-based assay. However, as of 2015 the complexity of the immune response had hindered efforts to identify people who would be likely to respond well to PD-1 inhibitors; in particular PD-L1 levels appear to be dynamic and modulated by several factors, and efforts to correlate PD-L1 levels before or during treatment with treatment response or duration of response had failed to reveal any useful correlations as of 2015.

Lung cancer 
In 2016, BMS announced the results of a clinical trial in which nivolumab failed to achieve its endpoint and was no better than traditional chemotherapy at treating newly diagnosed lung cancer. BMS went on to attempt to win approval for a combination therapy against lung cancer which included nivolumab and BMS's older drug ipilimumab. The application was withdrawn in early 2019 following disappointing clinical trial data.

Infusion times of 60 minutes and 30 minutes appear to have similar pharmacokinetics (absorption, distribution, metabolism, and elimination) of the treatment.

Nivolumab is indicated for the treatment of people with metastatic squamous non small cell lung cancer (NSCLC) with progression on or after platinum-based chemotherapy. CHECKMATE-227  tested the combination of nivolumab and ipilimumab in patients with stage IV or recurrent NSCLC without previous treatment. Patients with a PD-L1 expression level of 1% or more were randomized in a 1:1:1 ratio to receive nivolumab plus ipilimumab, nivolumab alone, or chemotherapy. The chemotherapy used was cisplatin or carboplatin, combined with Gemcitabine for patient with squamous cell NSCLC, or pemetrexed for patients with nonsquamous disease. The overall survival was 17.1, 15.7 and 14.9 months, respectively. The patients who had a PD-L1 expression level of less than 1% were randomly assigned in a 1:1:1 ratio to receive nivolumab plus ipilimumab, nivolumab plus chemotherapy, or chemotherapy. The OS was 17.2, 15.2 and 12.2 months, respectively

Melanoma 
PD-L1 is expressed in 40-50% of melanomas. Phase I and II clinical trials have shown nivolumab as a promising and durable treatment option in melanoma as a single agent and in combination with ipilimumab. Phase III trials are ongoing.

In October 2022, the results of a Phase 3 trial, CheckMate -76K, showed that Opdivo reduced the risk of death by 58% as an adjuvant therapy in patients with completely resected stage two melanoma, the most serious type of skin cancer.

Urothelial carcinoma 
In February 2023, BMS reported that the three-year follow-up results from its phase 3 (CheckMate-274) trial of nivolumab showed significant sustained clinical benefits with nivolumab for the adjuvant treatment of patients with muscle-invasive urothelial carcinoma at a high risk of recurrence after radical resection.

See also 
 Nivolumab/relatlimab

References

External links 
 
 
 
 
 
 
 
 
 
 
 
 
 
 
 
 
 
 
 
 
 
 
 
 
 

Antineoplastic drugs
Breakthrough therapy
Bristol Myers Squibb
Clinical trials sponsored by Bristol Myers Squibb
Monoclonal antibodies for tumors
Orphan drugs
World Health Organization essential medicines
Wikipedia medicine articles ready to translate